Halle Rosengarten station is a railway station in the Rosengarten district in the municipality of Halle (Saale), Saxony-Anhalt, Germany.

References

Rosengarten
Rosengarten